Haldia subdivision is a subdivision of the Purba Medinipur district in the state of West Bengal, India.

Subdivisions
Purba Medinipur district is divided into the following administrative subdivisions:

Administrative units

Haldia subdivision has 6 police stations, 5 community development blocks, 5 panchayat samitis, 38 gram panchayats, 320 mouzas, 312 (+ 1 partly) inhabited villages, 1 municipality and 4 census towns. The municipality is: Haldia. The census towns are: Garh Kamalpur, Nandigram, Ashadtalya and Barda. The subdivision has its headquarters at Haldia.

Area
Haldia subdivision has an area of 683.94  km2, population in 2011 of 959,934 and density of population of 1,404 per km2. 18.84% of the population of the district resides in this subdivision.

Police stations
Police stations in Haldia subdivision have the following features and jurisdiction:

*The data for area is as per the website of Purba Medinipur Police, but it appears that it has not been updated for a long time.

Blocks
Community development blocks in Haldia subdivision are:

Gram Panchayats
The subdivision contains 38 gram panchayats under 5 community development blocks:

 Mahishadal block: Amritaberia, Itamogra–I, Laksha–I, Natshal–I, Betkundu, Itamogra–II, Laksha–II, Satish Samanta, Garh Kamalpur, Kismat Naikundi and Natshal–II.
 Nandigram I block: Daudpur, Kalicharanpur, Nandigram, Bhakutia, Gokulnagar, Kendumari Jalpai, Samsabad, Haripur, Mahammadpur and Sona Chura.
 Nandigram II block: Amdabad–I, Birulia, Boyal–II, Khodambari–II, Amdabad–II, Boyal–I and Khodambari–I.
 Sutahata block: Ashadtalya, Guaberia, Joynagar, Chaitanyapur, Horkhali and Kukrahati.
 Haldia block: Baruttarhingli, Deulpota, Chakdwipa and Devog.

Haldia port
Haldia Dock Complex is an all-weather riverine port, 60 km from the pilotage station, with an annual capacity of 41.71 million tonnes. It comprises three riverine oil jetties, fourteen berths inside an impounded dock and two riverine barge jetties. It was commissioned in 1977.

Industry

Haldia oil refinery
Haldia oil refinery is one of the ten refineries of the Indian Oil Corporation. It was commissioned in 1975.

Haldia urban industrial complex
Haldia petro-chemical complex is one of the largest in India. It is a major industry which created jobs directly and indirectly in and around Haldia. Haldia Petrochemicals is the lead company. Amongst the other companies operating in the Haldia urban industrial complex are: Exide, Shaw Wallace, Tata Chemicals, Hindustan Lever and Mitsubishi Chemical Corporation.

Education
With a literacy rate of 87.66% Purba Medinipur district ranked first amongst all districts of West Bengal in literacy as per the provisional figures of the census of India 2011. Within Purba Medinipur district, Tamluk subdivision had a literacy rate of 85.98%, Haldia subdivision 86.67%, Egra subdivision 86.18% and Contai subdivision 89.19%. All CD Blocks and municipalities in the district had literacy levels above 80%.

Given in the table below (data in numbers) is a comprehensive picture of the education scenario in Purba Medinipur district for the year 2013-14.

Note: Primary schools include junior basic schools; middle schools, high schools and higher secondary schools include madrasahs; technical schools include junior technical schools, junior government polytechnics, industrial technical institutes, industrial training centres, nursing training institutes etc.; technical and professional colleges include engineering colleges, polytechnics, medical colleges, para-medical institutes, management colleges, teachers training and nursing training colleges, law colleges, art colleges, music colleges etc. Special and non-formal education centres include sishu siksha kendras, madhyamik siksha kendras, centres of Rabindra mukta vidyalaya, recognised Sanskrit tols, institutions for the blind and other handicapped persons, Anganwadi centres, reformatory schools etc.

The following institutions are located in Haldia subdivision:
Mahishadal Raj College at Mahishadal was established in 1946. In addition to courses in arts, science and commerce, it offers post-graduate courses in Bengali and chemistry.
Mahishadal Girls College at Mahishadal was established in 1969. It offers courses in arts and science.
Sitananda College at Nandigram was established in 1960. It offers courses in arts and science.
Haldia Government College at Haldia was established in 1988. In addition to regular courses in arts and science, it offers a post-graduate course in Travel and Tourism Management.
 Haldia Law College at Haldia was established in 2002. It offers (1) Five-year integrated B.A.-Ll.B. (Hons), (2) Three-year Ll.B. and (3) Two-year Ll.M. courses.   
 Haldia Institute of Technology at Haldia is a private-initiated engineering college offering degree courses. It was established in 1995.
Vivekananda Mission Mahavidyalaya at PO Chaitanyapur, Haldia was established in 1968. It offers courses in arts, science and commerce.
ICARE Institute of Medical Sciences and Research at Banbishnupur, PO Balughata, offers MBBS courses. It has been facing some administrative problems.

Healthcare
The table below (all data in numbers) presents an overview of the medical facilities available and patients treated in the hospitals, health centres and sub-centres in 2014 in Purba Medinipur district.  
 

Medical facilities available in Haldia subdivision are as follows:

Hospitals: (Name, location, beds) 
Haldia Subdivision Hospital, Khanjanchak, Haldia, 250 beds
Haldia Port Trust Hospital, Haldia, 47 beds
Dr. B.C. Roy Hospital, Banbishnupur, Balughata, Haldia, 700 beds
Rural Hospitals: (Name, CD block, location, beds)
Nandigram Rural Hospital, Nandigram I CD block, Nandigram, 30 beds
Reapara Rural Hospital, Nandigram II CD block, Reapara, 30 beds
Basulia Rural Hospital, Mahishadal CD block, Basulia, 30 beds
Block Primary Health Centre: (Name, block, location, beds)
Amlat BPHC, Sutahata CD block, Sutahata, 10 beds
Bargashipur BPHC, Haldia CD block, 10 beds, Barghasipur, 10 beds
Primary Health Centres: (CD block-wise)(CD block, PHC location, beds)
Nandigram I CD block: Mohammadpur, PO Nilpur (10), Mahespur, PO Parulbari (6)
Nandigram II CD block: Boyal (6), Amdabad (10)
Sutahata CD block:  Joynagar, PO Dorojoynagar (6), Begunberia, PO Golapchak (10)
Haldia CD block: Debhog (10), Barsundra, PO Iswardahajalpai (2)
Mahishadal CD block: Natsal, PO Geonkhali (10), Rajarampur, PO Geonkhali (?)

Electoral constituencies
Lok Sabha (parliamentary) and Vidhan Sabha (state assembly) constituencies in Purba Medinipur district were as follows:

External links

References

Subdivisions of West Bengal
Subdivisions in Purba Medinipur district
Purba Medinipur district